The Wakabunga  are an indigenous Australian people of the state of Queensland.

Language
Norman Tindale referred to material by two early correspondents, Urquhart and O'Reilley, in a publication by E. M. Curr for details about the Wakabunga and their language, but the word-list is not considered to contain elements of this tongue, about which the general belief is that no information survives regarding it. It has been suggested by Barry Blake however, that a word-list compiled in the Wakabunga domain by Curr's brother Montagu Curr, belong to a Mayi dialect. From this it has been inferred that Wakabunga may have belonged to the Mayi language family.

Country
The Wakabunga traditional lands covered an estimated  in the area of the Upper Leichhardt River and Gunpowder Creek.

People
According to Norman Tindale they were related to the Kalkatungu. They were crocodile hunters, stalking with spears the Australian freshwater crocodile on the upper Leichhardt.

Alternative names
 Workabunga,
 Workoboongo,
 Wakobungo, Waukaboonia.
 Waggabundi.
 Waggaboonyah.
 Kabikabi.

Notes

Citations

Sources

Aboriginal peoples of Queensland